Arthur Fox Sr. (21 January 1894 – 13 January 1933) was an Australian rules footballer who played for the Richmond Football Club in the Victorian Football League (VFL).		

Fox's son, Arthur Fox Jr. later played for the South Melbourne Swans in the VFL.

Notes

External links 
		

1894 births
1933 deaths
Australian rules footballers from Victoria (Australia)
Richmond Football Club players